Fäbodristningar or vallgångsristningar are text, symbols, runes, figures, initials and similar that have been found in Sweden carved into mountains or tree branches in connection with the herding of animals in the 17th century and forward, mainly left by youths who worked with the herding.

Origins
In Dalarna, Sweden, a few hundred carvings of this sort have been found, most of them in the Ore area (in Rättvik Municipality) of Dalarna. The carvings were made with a knife and often followed the same pattern of initials, year, and often information about them (importantly the first or last day of the fäbodperiod).

The carvings were often concentrated in certain locations and areas such as hills and close to the water as they were good places for herding in the north of Sweden. One of these places are Hästbergs klack north of Ludvika.  At times, a review of the herding period such as "Good" or "Bad" were found. On one tree branch in Ore, Dalarna, three girls who herded left a carving saying "We feel good as hell". It was customary that women made carvings on trees, while men made them on stones.

See also
List of runestones

References

Social history of Sweden
Runology